Karaçayır may refer to:

 Karaçayır, Aksaray, village in Aksaray Province, Turkey
 Karaçayır, Çelikhan, village in Adıyaman Province, Turkey